Sir William Fenwick, 2nd Baronet (c. 1617 – 9 July 1676), was an English landowner and politician who sat in the House of Commons at various times between 1645 and 1676.

Fenwick was the eldest surviving son of Sir John Fenwick, 1st Baronet of Wallington Hall, Northumberland and his second wife Grace Loraine and was educated at Morpeth Grammar School and Christ's College, Cambridge, before entering Gray's Inn. He succeeded his father circa 1658, his half-brother John having been killed at Marston Moor in 1644.

He sat as member of parliament for Northumberland between 1645 and 1648, and in 1654, 1656, 1659, 1660 and from 1661 to 1676.

He married Jane, the daughter of Henry Stapilton of Wighill, Yorkshire; they had a son and two daughters. He was succeeded by his son Sir John Fenwick, 3rd Baronet.

References

1676 deaths
Baronets in the Baronetage of England
Members of Gray's Inn
Year of birth uncertain
English MPs 1640–1648
English MPs 1654–1655
English MPs 1656–1658
English MPs 1659
English MPs 1660
English MPs 1661–1679
People from Northumberland
People educated at Morpeth School
Alumni of Christ's College, Cambridge
1617 births